Mickaël Seymand (born 15 July 1984) is a French professional footballer who currently plays for Championnat National 2 side Athlético Marseille. Born in Martigues, he started his career at Istres but did not make a first-team appearance for the club and later played in the Championnat de France amateur for both Marignane and Gap. Seymand joined Gazélec Ajaccio in 2010 and was part of the team that won successive promotions during the following two seasons. He made his professional debut in the 0–2 defeat away at his former club Istres on 3 August 2012.

After leaving Gazélec Ajaccio he played in Greece for Greek Football League side Niki Volou, before returning to France with Consolat Marseille and CA Bastia. He returned to Marignane Gignac (the new identity of US Marignane) in 2016.

References
Mickaël Seymand career statistics at foot-national.com

1984 births
Living people
People from Martigues
French footballers
Association football midfielders
FC Istres players
Marignane Gignac Côte Bleue FC players
Gap HAFC players
Gazélec Ajaccio players
Ligue 2 players
Championnat National players
French expatriate footballers
Expatriate footballers in Greece
French expatriate sportspeople in Greece
CA Bastia players
Niki Volos F.C. players
Athlético Marseille players
Sportspeople from Bouches-du-Rhône
Footballers from Provence-Alpes-Côte d'Azur